Black Rainbows is the fourth solo album by the English singer-songwriter Brett Anderson, released on 26 September 2011. This is Anderson's first solo album following Suede's reformation in 2010.

Anderson stated that Black Rainbows will be "restless, noisy and dynamic" and described it as a return to the rock band format.

Critically, the album was a major improvement over previous records as it garnered generally favourable reviews from critics, scoring 64 based on 13 critics at aggregator website Metacritic.

Track listing
All songs written by Brett Anderson, Leo Abrahams, Leopold Ross and Seb Rochford except where noted.

References

2011 albums
Brett Anderson albums
Albums produced by Leo Abrahams